Pamit may refer to:
Dimiat, a variety of grape
, a Greek cargo ship in service 1959-62
Pamit Inc., a privately held corporation registered in Nova Scotia, Canada
Pamit Cards, an online greeting card store.
 UN/LOCODE:PAMIT, a location code for Manzanillo International Terminal in Panama.

Songs 
"Pamit”, a song by Tulus from her 2016 album, Monokrom